Elsa-Marianne von Rosen (21 April 1924 – 7 September 2014) was a Swedish ballet dancer, choreographer and actress. She performed all over Scandinavia. She acted between 1939 and 1970. She appeared in the television series Tales of Hans Anderson.

In 1984, she was given the Royal Medal of Merit Litteris et Artibus. She also directed ballet plays outside of Scandinavia, in Monaco, the United States, the United Kingdom and Russia. She was the head of ballet at the Stora Teatern in Gothenburg between 1970 and 1976 and also of Malmöbaletten between 1980 and 1987.

Von Rosen was born in Stockholm. She was the daughter of the artist Count Reinhold von Rosen and Elisabeth Österyd, his first wife.

In 1950, von Rosen married editor Allan Fridericia (1921–1991). Soon after, they moved to Denmark. She died from natural causes on 7 September 2014 in Copenhagen. She was 90 years old.

Filmography
1939: Skanör-Falsterbo
1940: Kyss henne!
1941: Det sägs på stan
1950: Ung och kär
1954: Balettprogram
1957: Med glorian på sned
1958: Jazzgossen
1959: Fröken Julie
1967: Lorden från gränden
1970: The Only Way

References

External links
Elsa-Marianne von Rosen at The Ballerina Gallery

Further reading
 

Swedish ballerinas
1924 births
2014 deaths
Actresses from Stockholm
Swedish film actresses
Swedish television actresses
Swedish choreographers
20th-century Swedish ballet dancers
Litteris et Artibus recipients